Street Gossip is a commercial mixtape by Lil Baby. It was released on November 30, 2018, by Quality Control Music, Motown, Capitol Records and Wolfpack Music Group. It features guest appearances from Meek Mill, Gunna, 2 Chainz, Gucci Mane, Rylo Rodriguez, Offset, Young Thug, and NoCap.

Background
Lil Baby announced the project in early November 2018, later posting the cover art and track listing.

Cover art
The cover art features a black-and-white photograph of Lil Baby performing shirtless, with his name and the title displayed above them, with the words "Preacher Man" in the bottom right corner. Photo was shot by Joshua Nichols.

Commercial performance
Street Gossip debuted at number two on the US Billboard 200 with 88,000 album-equivalent units, including 5,000 pure sales in its first week. In its second week, the album dropped to number nine on the chart, moving another 42,000 album-equivalent units that week. On February 8, 2020, the album was certified gold by the Recording Industry Association of America (RIAA) for combined sales and album-equivalent units of over 500,000 units in the United States. It was Lil Baby's highest-charting project until his album My Turn debuted at number one in 2020.

Track listing
Credits adapted from Tidal.

Personnel
Credits adapted from Tidal.

Technical
 Thomas "Tillie" Mann – mixing 
 Princeton "Perfect Harmony" Terry – mixing assistant 
 Ethan Stevens – mixing 
 Colin Leonard – mastering

Charts

Weekly charts

Year-end charts

Certifications

References

2018 mixtape albums
Lil Baby albums
Quality Control Music albums
Albums produced by Metro Boomin
Albums produced by Wheezy
Albums produced by Quay Global
Motown albums
Capitol Records albums